Several people are known by the name Huguet
 Hugh V of Bas (died 1335), nicknamed Huguet
 Huguet - Gothic architect in Portugal (? - 1438)
 Jaume Huguet - Gothic painter(1415-1492)the most prominent figure in the Catalan School
 François Huguet, French architect (? – circa 1730)
 Charles Louis Huguet, marquis de Sémonville, French diplomat (1759-1839)
 Josep Huguet, former Minister of Trade, Tourism and Consumer Affairs of Catalonia (1951-)
 Anthony Huguet, competed for Australia in Alpine skiing at the 1994 Winter Olympics
 Gaietà Huguet, leader of the Republican Left of the Valencian Country
 Sonia Huguet, Women's road race for France at the 2004 Summer Olympics
 Katriana Huguet, American recording artist known professionally as Kat Dahlia (1990-)
 Bernard Huguet (born 1933), French chess master